Sheldon Bruce Kannegiesser (born August 15, 1947) is a Canadian former professional ice hockey player who played 366 games in the National Hockey League.  He played for the Pittsburgh Penguins, New York Rangers, Los Angeles Kings, and Vancouver Canucks.  Kannegiesser retired from hockey in 1978 and lives in North Bay. He published an autobiography written entirely in poetry, called "It is called Warriors of Winter: Rhymes of a Blueliner Balladeer." His brother was Gordon Kannegiesser.

Career statistics

References

External links
 

1947 births
Living people
Canadian ice hockey defencemen
Hershey Bears players
Ice hockey people from Ontario
Los Angeles Kings players
New York Rangers players
Pittsburgh Penguins players
Sportspeople from North Bay, Ontario
Springfield Indians players
Vancouver Canucks players